The  was the name given to bodies established by the Japanese military administration in Java and Sumatra in 1943 during the Japanese occupation of the Dutch East Indies to notionally provide Indonesians with popular representation.

Background

In early 1942, the Japanese invaded the Dutch East Indies, overrunning the archipelago in less than two months. The Dutch in Java surrendered on March 8. Initially, Indonesians welcomed the Japanese as liberators from the colonial regime. The Japanese divided the countries into three regions: Sumatra was under the 25th Army, Java and Madura under the 16th Army and Borneo and eastern Indonesia were controlled by Imperial Japanese Navy. The Japanese came to realize that if they wanted to exploit the nation's resources, they would have to give something back to the people in return, especially given the repressive nature of the occupation regime. The administration therefore decided to work with prominent Indonesian nationalists, including Sukarno - who the Japanese freed from the exile imposed by the Dutch - and Mohammed Hatta. The Japanese promised self-government in the future, and established a nationalist organization called Centre of People's Power (Poetra). The new body was headed by Sukarno, Hatta, Ki Hajar Dewantara and Mas Mansoer. The Japanese then appointed more advisers and on 15 September 1943, established the Central Advisory Council in Java, chaired by Sukarno. Sessions of the CAC were held in the same building that had been used by the Volksraad in Pejambon, central Jakarta. It is now known as the Pancasila Building.

Aims and role
The Central Advisory Council was even less powerful than the pre-war body set up by the Dutch, the Volksraad, as it was not allowed to criticize the government. Its role was limited to answering questions asked of it by the military administration. In the view of the Japanese, the council would encourage the people of Java and Madura to take responsibility for their lives in accordance with the wishes of the Japanese. The subjects it was allowed to discuss were:
 the development of the government
 improvements to standards of living
 education and information
 industry and the economy
 welfare and social assistance
 health

Java Central Advisory Council

Membership of Java Central Advisory Council 
Members were either appointed by the 16th Army commander (23 members) or elected by and from regional representative councils, 18 members from special municipality representative councils and 2 members from special region councils (Kōchi- 2 members). Many of them had been members of nationalist organizations and/or the Volksraad. Prominent members included Sukarno, Hatta, Ki Hajar Dewantara, Mas Mansoer and Rajiman Wediodiningrat. The council also had a secretariat comprising Javanese and Japanese members. The head as well as the two deputy heads were appointed directly by the head of the military administration. Following 7 September 1944 promise of future independence for the  Dutch East Indies, 14 new members were appointed. The members were:

Appointed by the Japanese military administration of Java 

Additional members appointed in 1943:

Elected by regional advisory councils 

Additional members appointed in 1943:
Asmo Asmodisastro (Besuki)
R. Soedirman (Surabaja)

Java Central Advisory Council Sessions

First Session (October 16–20, 1943) 
The session began with an expression of thanks from the Japanese for the willingness of the Indonesians to cooperate with the military regime. On October 17, Sukarno was appointed chairman while R.M.A.A. Koesoemo Oetojo and Boentaran Martoatmodjo  were appointed vice-chairmen. All three were inaugurated by the head of the secretariat.

After this session, on November 10, a delegation from the Central Advisory Council comprising Sukarno, Hatta and Bagoes Hadikoesoemo left for Tokyo. They had been invited to Japan to thank the Hirohito for his generosity in giving the Indonesians the opportunity to work with the military administration. The delegation arrived  on November 15. The following day the three men were decorated by the emperor. In a meeting with Japanese Prime minister Tojo, Sukarno asked for the ban on the Indonesian flag and the national anthem to be lifted and was told that the Japanese would consider these demands once they had won the war.

Second Session (January 30 - February 3, 1944) 
This session discussed the question from the Japanese military commander regarding practical ways the people of Java could organize their strength to be ready for victorious battle.

Third Session (7 - 11 May 1944) 
The question for this session was how to raise the awareness of the people regarding their obligations as well as to strengthen friendly cooperation regardless of nationality, work or rank.

Fourth Session (August 12–16, 1944) 
In July 1944, Saipan was captured by the Allies. Sinkings of Japanese shipping led to shortages in Java and the military commander ordered the Central Advisory Council to meet to discuss the question of how to increase the workforce, defend the nation and increase production.

Fifth (Special) Session (September 11, 1944) 
In August 1944, the war situation worsened further for Japan, with the loss of the Solomon Islands and the Marshall Islands. Prime Minister Tojo resigned and was replaced by Kuniaki Koiso. On September 7, Koiso promised independence for the 'East Indies' "later on" (di kemudian hari). The next day, the Japanese military commander ordered special session of the Central Advisory Council to discus the question of how the Indonesian people could prove their gratitude to the Japanese government and how to awaken the enthusiasm of the people to destroy the United States and Britain.

Sixth Session (November 12–17, 1944) 
This session was attended by a large number of Japanese officials and civilians as well as journalists. The question under discussion was how to obtain real results in concentrating the strength of every person to wage war and what must be done to improve living standards as the war reaches a zenith.

Seventh Session (February 21–26, 1945) 
The war situation continued to worsen, as did the economic circumstances. Meanwhile, the Japanese took a slightly softer and Council members began to criticize the administration. The question discussed at this session was how to rapidly implement modernization of people's lives.

Eighth Session (June 18–21, 1945) 
On March 1, 1945, the establishment of the Investigating Committee for Preparatory Work for Independence (BPUPK) was announced by the Japanese to work on "preparations for independence in the region of the government of this island of Java". The opening ceremony was held in the Central Advisory Council building on May 28. The first BPUPK plenary session was help from May 28 to June 1 to discuss the form of a future Indonesian state. On the final day, Sukarno made a speech in which he outlined the philosophical basis for the nation, the five principles subsequently known as Pancasila.

Before the beginning of the final session of the Central Advisory Council, Vice-chairman M.A.A. Koesoemo Oetojo resigned because of his age. The members elected Hatta to replace him. In the session, delegates urged the Japanese administration to include more young people in the national leadership. The question put by the military commander concerned how to implement the endeavor to motivate every person to direct their energies and undergo training to strengthen their defenses and purify efforts towards the preparation of Indonesian independence as soon as possible.

Sumatra Central Advisory Council
The commander of the Japanese Twenty-Fifth Army Lt. Gen Hamada Hiromu, was much less enthusiastic about independence for Sumatra, the region under his authority, and was opposed to the idea of Sumatra being a part of any future indonesian state. Therefore, it was almost years after the establishment of the Java Central Advisory Council, when on March 25, 1945, before a similar body was announced for Sumatra, but it did not meet for the first time until the end of June. It had 40 members, 25 appointed by the Japanese and 15 chosen by the ten regional advisory councils. Mohammad Sjafei was appointed chairman. The vice-chairmen were Abdoel Abas and Teuku Nyak Arif. Like the Java body, this council also had a secretariat. This was headed by Sumatra journalist Djamaluddin Adinegoro.

Membership of Sumatra Central Advisory Council 
The membership was as follows:

Appointed by the Japanese military administration of Sumatra

Elected by regional advisory councils

Sumatra Central Advisory Council Session (June 27–July 2, 1945) 
The Sumatra Central Advisory Council met in Bukitinggi to discuss questions put to  it by the Japanese military authorities. These concerned ways to strengthen the unity and resolve of the Sumatran people. It also passed a number of resolutions, including calling for the establishment of a Sumatran preparatory committee for independence and a 500,000-strong people's army. The Japanese subsequently announced a Sumatran Investigating Committee for Preparatory Work for Independence chaired by Mohammad Sjafei.

See also
 Investigating Committee for Preparatory Work for Independence (BPUPK)
 Preparatory Committee for Indonesian Independence (PPKI)

References

Works cited

 
 
 
 
 
 
 
 
 

1943 in the Dutch East Indies
History of Indonesia
Indonesia in World War II
Indonesian collaborators with Imperial Japan
Japanese occupation of the Dutch East Indies